The Canton of Saint-Amand-Montrond is a canton situated in the Cher département and in the Centre-Val de Loire region of France. It has 15,328 inhabitants (2018).

Geography
An area of forestry and farming in the valley of the Cher and in the arrondissement of Saint-Amand-Montrond.
The altitude varies from 137m at Bruère-Allichamps to 312m at Saint-Amand-Montrond, with an average altitude of 177m.

The canton comprises 13 communes:

Bouzais
Bruère-Allichamps
La Celle
Colombiers
Drevant
Farges-Allichamps
La Groutte
Marçais
Meillant
Nozières
Orcenais
Orval
Saint-Amand-Montrond

Population

See also
 Arrondissements of the Cher department
 Cantons of the Cher department
 Communes of the Cher department

References

Saint-Amand-Montrond